ONE 160: Ok vs. Lee 2 was a Combat sport event produced by ONE Championship that took place on August 26, 2022, at the Singapore Indoor Stadium in Kallang, Singapore.

Background
The event will be broadcast live on YouTube (only Thailand, United States and Canada) and Pay-Per-View on Watch ONE. 

A ONE Lightweight World Championship rematch between current champion Ok Rae Yoon and former champion (also 2019 ONE Lightweight World Grand Prix Champion) Christian Lee headlined the event. The pairing previously met at ONE: Revolution in September 2021 where Ok defeated Lee by unanimous decision.

A ONE Featherweight World Championship bout between current champion Thanh Le and Tang Kai at the co-main event.

The event featured a semi-final of the ONE Flyweight Muay Thai World Grand Prix Tournament between Superlek Kiatmoo9 and former ONE Flyweight Muay Thai World Championship challenger Walter Goncalves. The winner will advance to the World Grand Prix Tournament final. However, the bout was pushed back to ONE on Prime Video: Moraes vs. Johnson 2 for to compete together in tournaments.

A Welterweight bout between former ONE Welterweight World Champion Zebaztian Kadestam and former ONE Lightweight World Championship challenger Iuri Lapicus was expected to take place at the event. However, on August 10, it was announced that the bout will be moved to ONE on Prime Video 1: Moraes vs. Johnson 2.

A lightweight submission grappling bout between Valdir Rodrigues and Renato Canuto was expected to take place at the event. However, Rodrigues withdraw due to undisclosed reason and was replaced by Tommy Langaker.

Results

Bonus awards 
The following fighters received $50,000 bonuses.

Performance of the Night: Christian Lee, Saemapetch Fairtex, Martin Batur and Tommy Langaker

Aftermath
On September 27, 2022, it was announced that Martin Batur's technical knockout against Paul Elliott was overturned by International Doping Tests & Management (IDTM) after Batur has tested positive for a performance enhancing drug (PED) and he tested positive for an Anabolic steroid, which is a banned substance according to the World Anti-Doping Agency (WADA). He has been banned by ONE Championship for a year.

See also 

 2022 in ONE Championship
 List of ONE Championship events
 List of current ONE fighters

References 

Events in Singapore
ONE Championship events
2022 in mixed martial arts
Mixed martial arts in Singapore
Sports competitions in Singapore
August 2022 sports events in Singapore